Dalton Chase Schultz (born July 11, 1996) is an American football tight end who is a free agent. He played college football at Stanford.

Early years
Schultz attended Bingham High School in South Jordan, Utah. Along with football, he played basketball for the Miners athletic teams. As a senior, he caught 31 passes for 512 yards and nine touchdowns.

For his high school career, he had 76 receptions for 1,120 yards and 12 touchdowns. He committed to play college football for the Stanford Cardinal in January 2014.

College career
Schultz accepted a football scholarship from Stanford University. He did not see any action as a true freshman in 2014 and was redshirted.

In 2015 as a redshirt freshman, he played in all 14 games as a backup to Austin Hooper, catching 10 passes for 121 yards and one touchdown.

As a sophomore in 2016, he was named the starter after Hooper declared for the NFL Draft. He played in all 13 games, having 23 receptions for 222 yards (fourth on the team) and one touchdown. He helped block for running backs Christian McCaffrey and Bryce Love, while receiving honorable-mention All-Pac-12 honors.

Prior to the 2017 season, Schultz was named to the John Mackey Award watch list. In 13 games he was used mostly as a blocker, catching 22 passes for 212 yards (fifth on the team) and three touchdowns, while helping running back Love rush for 2,118 yards. He was named to the All-Pac-12 First-team, declaring for the 2018 NFL Draft after the season.

College statistics

Professional career

2018 
Schultz was selected by the Dallas Cowboys in the fourth round (137th overall) of the 2018 NFL Draft, to improve the depth at tight end after the surprising retirements of Jason Witten and James Hanna. He was the third-string tight end behind Geoff Swaim and Blake Jarwin. 

After Swaim was lost to an injury in Week 11, Schultz passed Jarwin on the depth chart as the starter and was used mostly for blocking purposes. He started seven of the eleven games he played and both playoff contests. He tallied 12 receptions for 116 yards, while contributing to running back Ezekiel Elliott being the NFL rushing champion.

2019 
In 2019, although Geoff Swaim left via free agency, Jason Witten returned to play professional football after spending one season as a Monday Night Football commentator, keeping Schultz as the team's third-string tight end. He appeared in 16 games, registering one reception for six yards and one kickoff return for five yards in limited play during the season.

2020 
On March 17, 2020, it was announced in the media that Jason Witten would be leaving the Cowboys to sign with the Las Vegas Raiders, opening the door for Schultz to compete for the backup position behind Blake Jarwin. After Jarwin was lost for the year with an ACL injury suffered in the season opener against the Los Angeles Rams, Schultz took over the starting tight end position. In Week 2 against the Atlanta Falcons, Schultz caught nine passes for 88 yards and his first career touchdown reception during the 40–39 comeback victory. Schultz exceeded expectations, becoming the fourth tight end in franchise history to have at least 60 receptions in a regular season (63), while collecting 615 receiving yards and four touchdowns, even though the Cowboys lost their starting quarterback Dak Prescott in Week 5 against the New York Giants.

2021
The 2021 season would see Schultz have career highs in every statistical category, accumulating 78 receptions, 808 yards and 8 touchdowns (tied for team lead).

NFL career statistics

Regular season

Postseason

Personal life
Schultz and his wife, Laurel Heinrich, have a son and a daughter.

References

External links
Dallas Cowboys bio
Stanford Cardinal bio

1996 births
Living people
American people of German descent
People from South Jordan, Utah
Players of American football from Utah
American football tight ends
Stanford Cardinal football players
Dallas Cowboys players